Gothika Vampyrika Heretika is the fourth solo studio album by Italian extreme metal vocalist Lord Vampyr, released on 21 September 2013 through Crank Music Group. The album continues the industrial/gothic sonority started with 2010's Horror Masterpiece, while reincorporating some of the symphonic/extreme metal elements of his first two records.

A teaser 7" single containing the track "Lamia" was released on 22 July 2013.

Track listing

Personnel
 Lord Vampyr (Alessandro Nunziati) – vocals
 Seth 666 (Andrea Taddei) – guitars
 STN Zyklon (Michele Arnone) – guitars
 Helvete (Ferenc Nádasdy) – keyboards
 Aerioch (Andrea di Nino) – bass
 Aeternus (Diego Tasciotti) – drums
 Kami Kopat – production, mastering

External links
 Lord Vampyr's official website

2013 albums
Lord Vampyr albums